Indina Ramayana is a 1984 Indian Kannada-language film, directed by Rajachandra and produced by Dwarakish. The film stars Vishnuvardhan, Gayathri, Sridhar and Tulasi. The film has musical score by Vijayanand. The movie is a remake of the Tamil movie Oorukku Upadesam. The movie had a successful run of 15 weeks in Bangalore and Mysore.

Cast

Vishnuvardhan 
Gayathri
Sridhar
Tulasi
C. R. Simha
Sathish
Dileep
Leelavathi
Devishree
Baby Leela
Alka
Mazhar Khan
Lohithaswa
Rathnakar
Tomato Somu
Suryakumar
B. V. Murthy
Sundar Raj
Hanumanthachar

Soundtrack
The music was composed by Vijay Anand.

References

1984 films
1980s Kannada-language films
Kannada remakes of Tamil films
Indian comedy-drama films
Films directed by Rajachandra
Films scored by Vijayanand